Benning Potoa'e (born September 17, 1996) is an American football defensive tackle for the Washington Commanders of the National Football League (NFL). He played college football at Washington and signed with the Tampa Bay Buccaneers as an undrafted free agent in 2020.

Professional career

Tampa Bay Buccaneers
Potoa'e signed with the Tampa Bay Buccaneers as an undrafted free agent following the 2020 NFL Draft on May 4, 2020. He was waived during final roster cuts on September 5, 2020, and signed to the team's practice squad the next day. He was placed on the practice squad/COVID-19 list by the team on November 30, 2020, and restored to the practice squad on December 5. He was elevated to the active roster on January 2 and 8, 2021, for the team's week 17 and wild card round games against the Atlanta Falcons and Washington Football Team, and reverted to the practice squad after each game. On February 9, 2021, Potoa'e re-signed with the Buccaneers.

On August 31, 2021, Potoa'e was waived by the Buccaneers and re-signed to the practice squad the next day. After the Buccaneers were eliminated in the Divisional Round of the 2021 playoffs, he signed a reserve/future contract on January 24, 2022.

Potoa'e was waived by the Buccaneers on August 30, 2022.

Washington Commanders
Potoa'e signed with the Washington Commanders' practice squad on September 13, 2022. He was promoted to the active roster on January 6, 2023.

References

External links
Washington Commanders bio
Washington Huskies football bio

1996 births
Living people
People from Pierce County, Washington
Players of American football from Washington (state)
American football defensive ends
American football defensive tackles
Washington Huskies football players
Tampa Bay Buccaneers players
Washington Commanders players